Rolls is a 2022 Russian comedy film directed by Oleg Asadulin. The film tells about a girl who dreams of her own cafe and finds herself in Sri Lanka, deprived of money, documents and a spouse, but with a hangover and three guys who do not like her at all, played by Kristina Asmus.

Rolls is scheduled to be theatrically released in 2022, by KaroRental.

Plot 
Talented baker Tanya Babanina from Protvino near Moscow bakes masterfully and dreams of her own cafe. But to fulfill a dream, they say, you need to get out of your comfort zone. And Tanya goes out on an international scale, finding crazy adventures on her rolls. One in Sri Lanka. Without money, documents and a husband who cheated on her immediately after the wedding. But with a hangover, in a winter coat and … under the same roof with three guys who are not at all happy with her.

Cast 
 Kristina Asmus as Tatiana "Tanya" Babanina, a baker / the second I am Tanya
 Arseny Robak as Boris "Borya" Romantsev, Tanya's fiancé after a divorce
 Boris Dergachev as Sasha
  as Kirill
 Vasant Balan as Raju, an Indian from entering the island
 Yuliya Topolnitskaya as Olya, Tanya's acquaintance
  as Svetlana "Sveta", a female police officer, and Tanya's friend
  as Elena Babanina, Tanya's mom
 Aleksandr Revenko as Igor, a business man

Production

Casting 
For example, one of the key actors Vasant Balan is a Russian comedian of the Indian descent who could not get a visa to go to Ceylon. As a Hindu, the artist came under a law temporarily banning Indian citizens from Sri Lanka.

Filming 
Principal photography for the project began in early March 2020 and took place in Sri Lanka. On March 12, after finishing the filming block, all the artists returned to Moscow. Six days later, Colombo Airport stopped operating all overseas flights due to the pandemic. The entire film crew did not have time to leave the island, in connection with this, the production of the film was temporarily suspended, as the team was under quarantine measures.

In the summer of 2021, it became known that the filming of the comedy in Sri Lanka had resumed. The film crew had to face a lot of unforeseen difficulties after a year and a half after a forced pause due to the pandemic.

Release 
The first teaser trailer of Rolls was released on November 19, 2021.

References

External links 
 

2022 films
2020s Russian-language films
2022 comedy films
Russian comedy films
Films about divorce
Films about alcoholism
Films set in Sri Lanka
Films shot in Moscow
Films shot in Russia
Films shot in Sri Lanka